Julian Hettwer (born 15 June 2003) is a German professional footballer who plays as a forward for MSV Duisburg.

Career
Hettwer made his professional debut for MSV Duisburg on 14 November 2020, in the 3. Liga away match against Türkgücü München. He signed a new contract on 1 June 2021. A new contract was signed on 2 February 2022, running until 2024.

Career statistics

References

External links

Julian Hettwer at kicker.de

2003 births
Living people
German footballers
Association football forwards
MSV Duisburg players
3. Liga players
Germany youth international footballers
Sportspeople from Bochum
Footballers from North Rhine-Westphalia